Neil Haman McTaggart (December 30, 1882 – January 28, 1962) was a farmer and political figure in Saskatchewan, Canada. He represented Maple Creek in the House of Commons of Canada from 1921 to 1925 as a Progressive Party member.

He was born on a farm near Guelph, Ontario and travelled west to Indian Head, Saskatchewan in 1905, later settling on land near Gull Lake. McTaggart grew grain and raised some livestock. In 1920, he married Gladys Elizabeth Brown. McTaggart was defeated when he ran for reelection in 1925. He died in 1962.

References 

Members of the House of Commons of Canada from Saskatchewan
Progressive Party of Canada MPs
1882 births
1962 deaths